The Southern Africa Customs Union and Mozambique (SACUM) is a customs union and trading bloc comprising the countries Botswana, Eswatini, Lesotho, Namibia, South Africa and Mozambique. Its predecessor is the Southern African Customs Union (SACU). SACUM was created after Mozambique entered into the Southern African Customs Union.

SADC-EU EPA 
The EU signed an Economic Partnership Agreement (EPA) on 10 June 2016 with the SADC group, comprising Botswana, Lesotho, Mozambique, Namibia, South Africa, Eswatini, and Angola; which the all of the SACU countries are also a part of. The agreement became the first regional EPA in Africa to be fully operational after Mozambique started applying to the EPA in February 2018.

SACUM-UK EPA 
The UK has created a number of free trade agreements & mutual recognition agreements with countries and trading blocs which will come into force on January 1, 2021, when the UK leaves the EU. One of such deal is the SACUM-UK EPA, an agreement on trade between the UK and the Southern African Customs Union member states and Mozambique.

References

Customs unions